Serhiy Serhiyovych Mashtalir (born 20 August 1998) is a Ukrainian professional footballer who plays as an attacking midfielder for Ukrainian club Obolon Kyiv.

References

External links
 
 
 

1998 births
Living people
Sportspeople from Uzhhorod
Ukrainian footballers
Association football midfielders
FC Hoverla Uzhhorod players
FC Mynai players
FC Uzhhorod players
FC Obolon-Brovar Kyiv players
Ukrainian First League players
Ukrainian Second League players
Ukrainian Amateur Football Championship players